The Canton of Marans is a canton of the Charente-Maritime département, in France. At the French canton reorganisation which came into effect in March 2015, the canton was expanded from 6 to 20 communes:
 
Andilly
Angliers
Benon
Charron
Courçon
Cramchaban
Ferrières
La Grève-sur-Mignon
Le Gué-d'Alleré
La Laigne
Longèves
Marans
Nuaillé-d'Aunis
La Ronde
Saint-Cyr-du-Doret
Saint-Jean-de-Liversay
Saint-Ouen-d'Aunis
Saint-Sauveur-d'Aunis
Taugon
Villedoux

Population history

See also 
 Arrondissements of the Charente-Maritime department
 Cantons of the Charente-Maritime department
 Communes of the Charente-Maritime department

References

 
Cantons of Charente-Maritime